Raul Prata (born 14 July 1987) is a Brazilian footballer who plays for Vitória as a right back.

Career
Born in Piracicaba, Raul Prata made his senior debut by the local team XV de Piracicaba. After a long passage by Luverdense and a short by Ituano, Raul Prata signed with Botafogo–SP on 24 December 2016.
On 10 January 2017, he left Botafogo without any match by the club, when he signed with Sport.

Career statistics

References

External links

1987 births
Living people
People from Piracicaba
Brazilian footballers
Association football defenders
Campeonato Brasileiro Série B players
Campeonato Brasileiro Série C players
Campeonato Brasileiro Série D players
Ituano FC players
Botafogo Futebol Clube (SP) players
Sport Club do Recife players
Esporte Clube Vitória players
Footballers from São Paulo (state)